John Hargis may refer to:

Colonel John Hargis (Kentucky settler), founder of Morehead, Kentucky
John Hargis (basketball) (1920-1986)
John Hargis (swimmer) (b.1975)